Nels Hagerup (1864 - March 13, 1922) was a Norwegian-born American painter. He emigrated to the United States in 1882. He lived in Portland until 1892, when he relocated to San Francisco.
He was married Harriet Marie Hageman Hagerup  (1851-1918). 

Over the course of his career, he did over 6,000 paintings, and he "won gold medals at the Portland and Seattle fairs."

References

Other sources
Edan Milton Hughes (1989) Artists in California, 1786-1940  (Hughes Pub Co) 

1864 births
1922 deaths
American male painters
Norwegian emigrants to the United States
Painters from California
20th-century American painters
20th-century Norwegian painters
20th-century American male artists